Josefa Kellner (12 March 1891 – 3 June 1965) was an Austrian swimmer. She competed in the women's 100 metre freestyle event at the 1912 Summer Olympics.

References

External links
 

1891 births
1965 deaths
Olympic swimmers of Austria
Swimmers at the 1912 Summer Olympics
Swimmers from Vienna
Austrian female freestyle swimmers